The 2016 Buffalo Funds - NAIA Men's Division I Basketball Tournament was held in March at Municipal Auditorium in Kansas City, Missouri. The 79th annual NAIA basketball tournament featured 32 teams playing in a single-elimination format.

2016 awards
Most consecutive tournament appearances: 25th, Georgetown (KY)
Most tournament appearances: 35th, Georgetown (KY)

2016 NAIA bracket

 denotes overtime

See also
2016 NAIA Division I women's basketball tournament
2016 NCAA Division I men's basketball tournament
2016 NCAA Division II men's basketball tournament
2016 NCAA Division III men's basketball tournament
2016 NAIA Division II men's basketball tournament

References

NAIA Men's Basketball Championship
Tournament
NAIA Division I men's basketball tournament
NAIA Division I men's basketball tournament